Methoni is a village and a former municipality in Pieria regional unit, Greece. Since the 2011 local government reform it is part of the municipality Pydna-Kolindros, of which it is a municipal unit.

History

The ancient Eretrian settlement of Methone, located at the interface between the Thessaloniki plain, the hilly terrain of Pieria and the shoreline of Thermaic Gulf, has gone through numerous wartime situations over the past centuries. Methone has been well known as an important harbor during the Greek times closely affiliated with the Athenian Alliance. According to historical manuscripts the urban settlement was distanced from the harbor. However, there exist no historical references about either the distance or the potential locations of the harbor.

Identification of the precise location of the port of Methone holds great significance from a geomorphological point of view, but above all represents a major archaeological concern. The port infrastructures appear to have been disconnected from the rest of the city: Several decrees (notably in 430 and 423 BC) provide us with information on the matter (Queyrel, 2003). These infrastructures had been seized by the powerful city of Athens, in order to leave Methone a degree of commercial autonomy with regards to the Kingdom of Macedon which was in full development at the time. One of these decrees, dated 430 BC, mentions that "the Methoneans must enjoy unrestricted rights to use the sea and [the Macedonians] must allow them, as before, to import goods on their territory".

We also know that in 359 BC, Argeas, former enemy of Amyntas (father of Philip II of Macedon), or according to certain historians (Diodorus, XVI, 3, 5.) one of his sons, had just obtained a fleet of 3,000 hoplites from the Athenians: The troops disembarked and then set up in Methone. No more references to the city are to be found in the texts after the seizure, then destruction, of the city by Philip II's armies during the summer of 354 BC. There are signs of occupation during the Imperial period but there is no evidence of a continuous presence in the sector after the 4th century BC (Papazoglou, 1988).

Research efforts aiming to locate ancient Methone were undertaken from the 19th century, first by the famous English explorer W.M. Leake (Leake, 1967) who had traveled Macedonia at length and then by Léon Heuzey (Heuzey, 1876), who thought he had found the port of former Methone, "marked by a small creek forming the shore not far from the mouths of Haliacmon" (Heuzey, 1876). Their respective research remained imprecise and no definite occupation site was ever identified. Their research was more focused on the quest for the royal tomb of Philip II and the necropolis of the Temenid and Macedonian kings: Aigai, identified in the 1980s with the site of modern Vergina.

In the middle of the 20th century, Hammond used the descriptions of Strabo (Strabon, VII, fragments 20 and 22), positioning the city of Methone at 70 stades (14 km) from Aloros (the original city of Ptolemy of Aloros) and at 40 stades (8 km) from Pydna (Pydna (Ancient Site)), to produce the hypothesis whereby Methone must have been located nearby the current eponymous city. Later, during the 1980s, two occupation sites were confirmed: The first, dating from the Archaic and Classical periods (Site A), was identified using archaeological material that had been found and then analyzed. The second site, located slightly further north, dates from the Imperial period (site B) and presents a smaller spatial extension than the first (Hatzopoulos et al., 1990); nevertheless, no hypotheses concerning the location of port infrastructures were formulated, or even suggested.

Geography

Administrative division
The municipal unit of Methoni consists of the communities of Makrygialos, Methoni, Nea Agathoupoli and Palaio Eleftherochori. The seat of the former municipality of Methoni, that ceased to exist after the 2011 local government reform was in Makrygialos. The municipal unit has an area of 34.286 km2, the community 10.321 km2.

Population
The population of the community of Methoni is 746 people and that of the municipal unit of Methoni is 3,169 people as of 2011.

External links
 apport et intérêt de la modélisation numérique de terrain en géomorphologie : étude du site antique de Méthoni
 Use of DEM in locating potential harbours of Ancient Methoni

References

Populated places in Pieria (regional unit)
Greek colonies in Pieria
Eretrian colonies
Members of the Delian League